Majar al-Kabir is a town in Maysan Governorate, southern Iraq, approximately 24 km from Amarah.

History
In 2003, six British servicemen of the Royal Military Police were killed there during the Battle of Majar al-Kabir by Iraqi civilians.

References

External links
BBC News report covering the attack

Populated places in Maysan Province